John Edward Beck  (May 10, 1869 – July 25, 1952) was a Massachusetts businessman, and politician who served in both branches of the Massachusetts legislature; and as a member of the Board of Aldermen, and the twenty fourth Mayor of Chelsea, Massachusetts.

Business career
Beck was a business who was involved in real estate and insurance and the publisher of The Chelsea Gazette.

External links
 Mayors of Chelsea 1857 – 1991.

See also
 1905 Massachusetts legislature
 1916 Massachusetts legislature
 1917 Massachusetts legislature
 1918 Massachusetts legislature
 1919 Massachusetts legislature
 1923–1924 Massachusetts legislature
 1925–1926 Massachusetts legislature
 1927–1928 Massachusetts legislature

Notes

1869 births
Politicians from Chelsea, Massachusetts
American newspaper publishers (people)
Massachusetts city council members
Republican Party members of the Massachusetts House of Representatives
Republican Party Massachusetts state senators
Mayors of Chelsea, Massachusetts
1952 deaths